Luigi Adami (12 December 1900 - 4 July 1985) was an Italian sports shooter. He competed in the 50 m rifle event at the 1948 Summer Olympics.

References

External links

1900 births
1985 deaths
Italian male sport shooters
Olympic shooters of Italy
Shooters at the 1948 Summer Olympics
Sportspeople from Bologna